Alirajpur State was formerly a princely state of India, administratively under the Bhopawar Agency subdivision of the Central India Agency. The state covered an area of 2165 square kilometres, with a population of 50,185 in 1901 and its capital at Alirajpur. The average revenue of the state was Rs.100,000 in 1901.

History

The early history of the state is not very clear, the founder of the state was either Anand Deo or Ude Deo. The state got its name from the fort of Ali and the capital of Rajpur. The rulers of Alirajpur claim to be Rathore's from the royal family of Jodhpur, however this claim is not accepted by the Maharaja's of Jodhpur. The state came under British rule in 1817. The last ruler of Ali Rajpur was Surendra Singh, who subsequently served as the Ambassador of India to Spain in the 1980s. After Indian independence in 1947, Alirajpur acceded to the Union of India, and the principality was incorporated into the new state of Madhya Bharat, which subsequently became Madhya Pradesh state on 1 November 1956.

The state flag consisted of 12 red and white horizontal stripes. The Raja had a personal flag with five stripes of different colors.

Alirajpur State is the birth place of the Indian revolutionary from the Indian struggle against the British Rule, Chandra Shekhar Azad.

Rulers

Ranas  
1437 - 1440                Anand Deo                          (d. 1440)
1440 - ....                Pratap Deo
.... - ....                Chanchal Deo
.... - ....                Gugal Deo
.... - ....                Bachchharaj Deo
.... - ....                Dip Deo
.... - ....                Pahad Deo I                
.... - ....                Udai Deo
.... - 1765                Pahad Deo II                       (d. 1765) 
1765 - 1818                Pratap Singh I                     (d. 1818) 
1818                       Musafir Mekran 
1818 - 17 Mar 1862         Jashwant Singh  (usurper)                  (b. 1818 - d. 1862) 
1818 - 1839                Musafir Mekran -Manager
1862 - 1869                Gang Deo                           (b. c.1845 - d. 1871) 
1869 - 29 Oct 1881         Rup Deo                            (b. 1847 - d. 1881) 
1869 - 1873                Muhammad Najaf Khan -Superintendent
1881 - 16 Aug 1890         Bijai Singh                        (b. 1881 - d. 1890) 
16 Aug 1890 – 14 Feb 1891  Interregnum 
14 Feb 1891 - 1911         Pratap Singh II                    (b. 1881 - d. af. 1950) (installed Mar 1892)

Rajas 
1911 - 1941                Pratap Singh II                    (s.a.) (from 3 Jun 1933, Sir Pratap Singh II)(personal style of Maharaja from 1941)
1941 - 23 Oct 1941         Fateh Singh                        (b. 1904 - d. 1941) 
23 Oct 1941 – 15 Aug 1947  Surendra Singh                     (b. 1923 - d. 1996) 
23 Oct 1941 – 15 Aug 1947  Sir Pratap Singh -Regent           (s.a.)

See also
Bhopawar Agency
Political integration of India
Chandra Shekhar Azad

References

External links 

Alirajpur district
Princely states of Madhya Pradesh
States and territories disestablished in 1948
15th-century establishments in India
1437 establishments in Asia
1948 disestablishments in India
States and territories established in 1437
Rathores
Rajputs

ca:Alirajpur